Mogo is a fictional DC Comics character. 

Mogo may also refer to:

 Mogo, New South Wales, Australia, a small heritage town
 Mogo, Chad
 Mogo Creek, New South Wales
 Mogo (company), a Canadian finance company
 Mogo Wheelchairs, Australian manufacturer of sporting wheelchairs
 HK Mogo, a top-tier ice hockey team based in Riga, Latvia
 Music of Ghanaian Origin (MOGO), a music festival in Ghana, started in 2007
 "Mogo?", a song on the album Wow 2 by Japanese experimental band Boredoms
 MoGo, a computer Go program
 Mogo, one of the first two recorded Australian Aboriginal trackers
 Mogo, a local name for Ugali, a cornmeal mush

See also
 Isla Mogo Mogo, an island of Panama
 Mogoș, a commune in Transylvania, Romania